Zhou Ying is a Chinese actress. She was formerly based in Singapore and was a full-time Mediacorp artiste from 2007 to 2014.

Career 
A graduate of the Shanghai Theatre Academy, Zhou moved to Singapore to take part in Star Search 2007 and was under the mentorship of acclaimed veteran actress Huang Biren. Although she was eliminated in the quarterfinals, she was offered a contract by MediaCorp. She signed as a full-time artiste in 2010 and moved to Singapore permanently.

Zhou gained her first nomination for Best Actress. She won her first Top 10 Most Popular Female Artistes in 2011 and was nominated from 2012 to 2014. She was nominated for Favourite Female Character and Favourite Onscreen Couple (Drama). In 2013 , she was nominated for Favourite Onscreen Couple (Drama).

In January 2014, Zhou left Singapore as her contract with MediaCorp was to end in April. She returned to Shanghai to be with her family and also to pursue acting opportunities in China.

Filmography

Television

Hosting

Accolades

References

External links
Profile on xinmsn

1984 births
Living people
Chinese television actresses
21st-century Chinese actresses
Shanghai Theatre Academy alumni
Actresses from Shanghai